Winameg is an unincorporated community in Fulton County, in the U.S. state of Ohio.
Pike Township maintains its government and maintenance facilities in Winameg.

History
The community is named after a Potawatomi Indian chief, named Winameg. The chief became friends with a white pioneer. They first met under a large white oak tree that stood until 1992 in Winameg. The tree is referred to as the Council Oak. A historical plaque marks where it once stood. Chief Winameg is buried in Winameg, alongside his friend Dresden Howard. Chief Winameg and Howard are remembered in Fulton County with life-size depiction of both figures, carved from the wood of a historical tree in Winameg under which the two first met, and displayed at Sauder Village in Archbold, Ohio.

A post office called Winameg was established in 1856, and remained in operation until 1902.

Gallery

References

Individual oak trees
Unincorporated communities in Fulton County, Ohio
Unincorporated communities in Ohio